Pima or PIMA may refer to:

People 
 Pima people, the Akimel O'odham, Indigenous peoples in Arizona (U.S.) and Sonora (Mexico)

Places
 Pima, Arizona, a town in Graham County
 Pima County, Arizona
 Pima Canyon, in the Santa Catalina Mountains
 Pima, Burkina Faso, a village
 Pima villages, historical villages of the Pima people

Other
 PIMA, the Portable Infrared Mineral Analyzer, a type of Infrared Spectroscopy
 Pima (moth), a snout moth genus of tribe Phycitini
 Pima cotton
 Pacific Islands Museums Association